Madeline Schmidt (born May 5, 1995) is a Canadian sprint kayaker.

Career
In 2018, as part of the K-4 boat, Schmidt finished in 9th place at the 2018 World Championships. In 2019, Schmidt finished 24th overall in the K-1 500 event at the 2019 World Championships.

In May 2021, Schmidt was named to Canada's 2020 Olympic team.

References

1995 births
Canadian female canoeists
Living people
Sportspeople from Ottawa
Canoeists at the 2020 Summer Olympics
Olympic canoeists of Canada